The Iglesia de la Inmaculada Concepción de Vega Alta is a church built by 1831 on the town plaza of Vega Alta, Puerto Rico.

It was listed on the U.S. National Register of Historic Places in 1984 as the "Church Inmaculada Conception of Vega Alta".

Gallery

See also
National Register of Historic Places listings in northern Puerto Rico

References

Churches on the National Register of Historic Places in Puerto Rico
Vega Alta, Puerto Rico
1831 establishments in Puerto Rico
Roman Catholic churches in Puerto Rico
Roman Catholic churches completed in 1831
Spanish Colonial architecture in Puerto Rico